The Lick It Up World Tour was a concert tour by American hard rock band Kiss, in support of their eleventh studio album Lick It Up. It was the last tour to feature lead guitarist Vinnie Vincent.

Background
It was the first tour the band performed without wearing their trademark make-up, following the reveal of the members without them on MTV in September 1983, basing it on how bands, fans and the times change. The tour began in Cascais, Portugal on October 11, 1983 when they performed for the first time without the usage of makeup. According to Simmons, fan reaction in Europe was 'greater than ever' and had sold out in advance. When asked if the removal of the makeup meant that it was a farewell tour, Simmons stated that it was not, saying "If that were the case, I'd rather let the thing fade away. We're only doing this because, after the tour and making Lick It Up, we feel stronger than ever."

The "tank" stage design from the preceding Creatures of the Night tour was used again, keeping all the same gimmicks. The January 11 show in Nashville was recorded, and an edited version aired on The King Biscuit Flower Hour. At the January 27 show in Long Beach, Kiss were presented with their first gold records since 1980 for the Lick It Up album.

Lead guitarist Vinnie Vincent was fired after the European Tour due to "unethical behavior". Kiss did not have enough time to search for another guitarist, so they re-hired Vincent for the North American leg until his firing became permanent after the tour ended. Bass guitarist Gene Simmons stated in various interviews that Vincent's dismissal was because he never signed his contract as an official member of Kiss and for unethical behavior. Stanley later admitted that Vincent had to go, stating that he was getting worse and stalling the shows with lengthy guitar solos. There were also issues regarding Vincent over his salary, who wanted a better deal and complained about the contract and working conditions, who eventually drove Stanley and Simmons to fire him when they accused him of trying to hijack the band.

In the tour program for the band's final tour, Simmons reflected on the tour:

Reception
A local reporter who attended the Lakeland performance on December 29, 1983, opened their review by stating that before the removal of the make-up, it was easy to laugh at Kiss - referring to them as clowns that weren't amusing. However, they noted the positivity of the changes in the band's personnel and the band's hopes to retake the lead in the heavy metal industry. They praised the song "I Love It Loud", citing it as a song to capsulize the revitalized band's performance to 6,000 fans that night.

Chuck Gates, a reporter from the Deseret News, who had attended the Salt Palace performance on February 5, 1984, opened his review by stating that the band was 'mediocre then and still is'. He noted on the inclusion of songs from the band's album Lick It Up, but had inquired about the exclusion of the band's two hit songs "Beth" and "I Was Made for Lovin' You". Regarding the stage, he acknowledged the lack of theatrics and makeup, and the absence of both Ace Frehley and Peter Criss - to which he stated that all that was left was a mediocre heavy metal band playing at deafening volumes.

John Laycock from the Windsor Star who had attended the Cobo Arena show opened their review by stating that the band continued to roar without their makeup. He acknowledged the usage of Simmons' fire-breathing effects and the new wave haircuts that band members had. Even with the sight of no makeup, he reported the sturdiness of the band's songs during the performance, as well as noting on how the band's clothes had changed and not the music. He concluded his review, saying that the show remains a vividly staged break from sanity.

Setlist
These are example setlists of what was performed during the tour on each leg, but may not represent the majority of the tour.

European setlist
 "Creatures of the Night"
 "Detroit Rock City"
 "Cold Gin"
 "Fits Like a Glove"
 "Firehouse"
 "Exciter"
 "War Machine"
 "Gimme More"
 "I Love It Loud"
 "I Still Love You"
 "Young and Wasted"
 "Love Gun"
 "Black Diamond"
Encore
 "Lick It Up"
 "Rock and Roll All Nite"

North American setlist
 "Creatures of the Night"
 "Detroit Rock City"
 "Cold Gin"
 "Fits Like a Glove"
 "Firehouse"
 "Gimme More"
 "War Machine"
 "I Love It Loud"
 "I Still Love You"
 "Young and Wasted"
 "Love Gun"
 "All Hell's Breakin' Loose"
 "Black Diamond"
Encore
 "Lick It Up"
 "Rock and Roll All Nite"

Tour dates

Personnel 
 Paul Stanley – vocals, rhythm guitar
 Gene Simmons – vocals, bass
 Eric Carr – drums, vocals
 Vinnie Vincent – lead guitar, backing vocals

References

Sources

Kiss (band) concert tours
1983 concert tours
1984 concert tours